Buffy the Vampire Slayer: Wrath of the Darkhul King is a 2003 platform game developed by Natsume and published by THQ. Based on the television show Buffy the Vampire Slayer, the game features Buffy Summers who fights vampires, demons, and other supernatural entities as the Slayer. The player controls Buffy through 16 side-scrolling levels that focus on solving puzzles and defeating enemies by using customizable weapons. Set in the show's fourth season, the story is about Buffy attempting to prevent a demonic warlord from returning to Earth.

THQ produced Wrath of the Darkhul King in a publishing agreement with Fox Interactive, and chose Natsume as the developers because they had been working together since 1999. Influenced by their family-friendly image, Natsume presented Buffy as an inspirational character to their young audience. The developer struggled with adapting Buffy the Vampire Slayer into 2D computer graphics, citing issues with character sprites.

Wrath of the Darkhul King was released for the Game Boy Advance. It was the third of six Buffy the Vampire Slayer video games. Critical reception of the game was poor; reviewers disliked the gameplay and lack of connection to the television series, but had a mixed response to the graphics and audio.

Gameplay 

Wrath of the Darkhul King is a side-scrolling platform game with beat 'em up elements. The game is divided into 16 linear levels in environments that include a cemetery, an abandoned hospital, and a college campus. The levels include obstacles, such as pendulums, spikes, falling rocks, and unstable platforms. The player, as Buffy Summers, completes levels by locating the correct switch to open a gate or turn off hazards, such as a steam pipe. Buffy can progress through levels by swimming and by using ladders, ropes, and metal bars. In some areas, she can rescue people who are all portrayed as men in red shirts. When the game's difficulty levels are adjusted to a more challenging setting, the entrances and puzzle solutions are changed.

Buffy encounters bosses including the supersoldier Adam and the demonic Gentlemen; there are five enemy types: a male and a female vampire, the Gentlemen's minions, and two species of demons. Vampires are primarily killed with stakes, which can be found throughout each level. Buffy can also eliminate them by destroying rooftops to expose the vampires to sunlight or by kicking them off ledges. Buffy's primary moves are punches, blocks, a high kick, and a crouching kick; she can also interact with objects in the environment to hurt bosses.

Throughout the levels, Buffy can find and use 16 types of weapons including an axe, a crossbow, a dagger, a flamethrower, holy water, a laser rifle, a torch, and the Glove of Myhnegon. Each weapon can only be used a limited number of times. Ranged weapons stun enemies, but only melee weapons and physical attacks can defeat them. Each weapon becomes more powerful with upgrades, such as combining a torch and a dagger to make a flaming dagger. Buffy accesses weapons via an inventory screen.

Although Buffy is the only playable character, other characters from Buffy the Vampire Slayer appear in cutscenes between levels. These scenes are digitized stills from the series, and dialogue is conveyed through subtitles. Buffy's boyfriend Riley Finn appears in certain areas to provide weapons and health in the form of presents.

Plot
Adapted from the television show Buffy the Vampire Slayer, Wrath of the Darkhul King follows Buffy Summers, a Slayer destined to fight vampires, demons, and other supernatural entities. Taking place in the show's fourth season, the game features the Darkhul Kinga demonic warlord who ruled the Earth for over 500 years before a witch trapped him in his own dimensionas the main antagonist. Buffy starts an extra credit assignment on the museum's Amelia Earhart exhibit, but she is interrupted when a demon steals a talisman. Her alliesRupert Giles, Willow Rosenberg, and Xander Harrisdo research while Buffy conducts patrols. Xander's girlfriend and former vengeance demon Anya Jenkins provides insight on the demons, informing Buffy that they typically work for a master.

Buffy confronts the leader of a vampire nest, Adam, and demons known as the Gentlemen and their minions. During her patrols, she finds demons excavating for the Scepter of Thelios and later conducting a ritual. Giles informs her that they are attempting to free the Darkhul King, and he advises her to locate the demon's prison, the Temple of Shadows. When the Darkhul King is freed, Buffy recovers the Glove of Myhnegon to defeat him. She beats the Darkhul King, who swears revenge against her. After beating him, Buffy realizes that her mission distracted her from completing her extra credit assignment.

Development and release

In July 2002, THQ announced the production of Wrath of the Darkhul King as part of a publishing agreement with Fox Interactive, alongside the Game Boy Advance port of The Simpsons: Road Rage (2001). It was their second Buffy the Vampire Slayer video game collaboration after releasing their Game Boy Color game in 2000. THQ chose Natsume to develop Wrath of the Darkhul King based on their working relationship since 1999. Sosuke Yamazaki directed its development and Iku Mitzutani served as producer.

Natsume began development by considering how best to represent Buffy's story and character through the Game Boy Advance. Wrath of the Darkhul King was created for a young audience based on Natsume's reputation for family friendliness. Natsume described Buffy as an inspirational character for children.

Though Wrath of the Darkhul King was released after the television show ended, Natsume believed the game would benefit from the show's continued popularity. Wrath of the Darkhul King is the third of six Buffy the Vampire Slayer video games; like other games based on the series, it does not explain the characters' backstories or relationships, instead marketing itself to the show's established fanbase.

Natsume designed Wrath of the Darkhul King as an action game, but added puzzles to vary gameplay. They also limited dialogue to avoid gameplay interruptions. Because of restrictions placed on the Game Boy Advance, the company was only allowed to include four bosses in the game. Natsume chose enemies that would make "the strongest impression" and could be defeated in different ways. The developers had difficulty adapting a television show into 2D computer graphics, explaining that they struggled the most with programming the character sprites against a 2D background.

GameSpot published a "first look" at Wrath of the Darkhul King in June 2003. The game was released for the Game Boy Advance in North America on June 24, 2003. It was in the top ten most-ordered games on the online marketplace Amazon for two weeks in June 2003.

Critical reception

According to the review aggregator Metacritic, Wrath of the Darkhul King received generally negative reviews. GameSpy described it as the worst Game Boy Advance platformer, and in a 2014 Hobby Consolas cited it as one of the worst video games adaptations of a television property. In a more positive review, BBC praised Wrath of the Darkhul King as a "snappy, traditional side-scrolling platform game".

Reviewers criticized the controls as poorly done. GameZone described Wrath of the Darkhul King as hampered by unresponsive controls and recycled level designs. IGN questioned the designers' familiarity with the Game Boy Advance due to collision detection issues; the website wrote that the "wonky" controls often resulted in combat moves being off by a pixel and not working. Nintendojo questioned the decision to have players use  the shoulder buttons to jump. UGO considered the gameplay to be too slow, and jokingly compared Buffy to a senior citizen. Computer and Video Games summed up Wrath of the Darkhul King was "fairly bog-standard stuff"; although the magazine praised the weapon types, it panned the puzzles as unoriginal.

Criticism also focused on the level design. GameSpy and Nintendojo felt it was too difficult to distinguish which areas were platforms, and in a similar sentiment, GameSpot disliked the placement of obstacles and platforms outside the player's field of vision. On the other hand, Nintendojo considered the platforming elements to be "challenging and fun almost from the start", and thought the levels were well-thought-out. Entertainment Weekly enjoyed the overall gameplay, praising how "the virtual Slayer actually looks, moves, and grunts like the real Ms. Summers" and highlighting how the player could interact with the environment to kill enemies.

The graphics received mixed reviews. Citing them as the game's highlight, AllGame said the backgrounds were detailed and the character sprites well-animated. As well as praising the background art, GameZone wrote that the special effects were "quite beautiful to watch, especially when lighting up a demon or dusting a vampire". In a retrospective list of the Buffy the Vampire Slayer video games, Syfy Wire identified Wrath of the Darkhul King as having "an expressive Buffy and believable character models". GameZone and GameSpy both praised the graphic quality for the digitized stills used in cutscenes, while X-Play and AllGame complained the cutscene stills were too repetitive. Despite their positive response to the game's animation, GameSpot criticized the repetition of certain locations and the small size of Buffy's sprite. IGN panned the art style as "full of awkward angles and poorly-drawn sprites".

Critics had a mixed response to the sound. GameSpot referred to the music as the high point of the game, writing that it was "eerily similar" to a Castlevania game. GameSpy and GameZone likened the soundtrack to a Nintendo Entertainment System (NES) game. While GameSpy said it was "cool in a retro sort of way", GameZone questioned how it fit with a Buffy the Vampire Slayer adaptation. The website thought the game would have benefited from sound effects for pushing crates and pulling switches. Criticizing the soundtrack as "grating and repetitive", AllGame wished the player had the choice to turn it off in the options menu. The site wondered why the show's theme song was absent from the game. Nintendojo dismissed the audio as "very bland and largely forgettable".

Publications, such as Metacritic, found the game too disconnected from its source material. Aside from the characters, cutscenes, and some enemies, AllGame felt nothing in the game was directly tied to the series. SyFy Wire panned it for lacking "deep characterization or uniquely Buffy content", and GameSpot believed this disconnection made "playing it that much more painful". However, The Guardian said Wrath of the Darkhul King "really captures the atmosphere of its TV influence", and Nintendojo described the game as a "fine distraction while it lasts" for fans of the series.

References

Citations

Book sources 

 
 

2003 video games
Beat 'em ups
Game Boy Advance-only games
Game Boy Advance games
THQ games
Natsume (company) games
Fox Interactive games
Side-scrolling platform games
Video games based on Buffy the Vampire Slayer
Video games developed in Japan
Video games scored by Kinuyo Yamashita
Video games set in California